Felicia Pride (born 1979) is an American author, screenwriter, producer, and director. She is the author of six books, including the young adult novel Patterson Heights. Pride has written for the television shows Queen Sugar and Grey's Anatomy. Her 2020 directorial debut tender received the STARZ/Lionsgate Short Film Award at the 2020 BlackStar Film Festival.

Early life and education
Pride was born in 1979 in Baltimore, Maryland. Her family moved to West Orange, New Jersey when she was young. She lived there until the age of eleven before returning to Baltimore to complete middle and high school. She attended Towson University where she studied marketing. Pride received her master's degree in writing and publishing from Emerson College in 2005.

Career

Books 
Pride began her writing career in 2001, writing for the community newspaper Black Reign News based in Staten Island, New York. Over the period of 15 years, Pride has authored six books. Her motivational book of essays, The Message: Life Lessons from Hip-Hop's Greatest Songs was published in 2007. The book has been used as a teaching tool in classrooms across the country and was re-issued by NBCUniversal. Her young adult novel, Patterson Heights was a 2010 American Library Association Pick for Reluctant Readers.

TV and film 
Pride's first written film was the dramatic short The End Again (2014) starring Columbus Short and Tanee McCall, directed by Crystal C. Roberson and co-produced with Latisha Fortune. The film was written as a prequel to the in-production feature film OpenEnded is in production. Pride was selected as a Film Independent Screenwriting Fellow in 2016.

Pride joined her first writer's room for the fourth season of Queen Sugar, and was also the story editor for the show's fifth season. She is also on the writing staff of the seventeenth season of Grey's Anatomy.

Her directorial debut was the short film tender, about two Black women in the aftermath of a one-night stand. The film received the STARZ/Lionsgate Short Film Award at the 2020 BlackStar Film Festival. That year she also co-wrote and executive produced her first feature drama film Really Love, which received a Special Jury Recognition for Acting award at SXSW 2020.

In April 2021 it was announced that Pride's romantic drama script Like It's the Last is in development by Will Packer and James Lopez, and she is also an executive producer on the project.

Works

Books
 The Message: 100 Life Lessons from Hip-Hop's Greatest Songs (2007)
 Hallway Diaries (2007)
 Everybody Hates Chris: Everybody Hates First Girlfriends (2007)
 Everybody Hates Chris: Everybody Hates School Politics (2008)
 Patterson Heights (2009)
 To Create: Black Writers, Filmmakers, Storytellers, Artists and Media Makers Riff on Art, Careers, Life, and the Beautiful Mess in Between (2012)
 The Message: Life Lessons from Hip-Hop's Greatest Songs (reissued; 2012)
 The Educator's Guide to The Message: A Digital Companion (2012)

Short fiction 
 It’s All Love: Black Writers on Soul Mates Family and Friends edited by Marita Golden (2009)

Filmography

Film

Television

Accolades
2010 – Quick Picks for Reluctant Young Readers, American Library Association (for Patterson Heights)
2013 – Media Fellow at the Center for Media & Social Impact, American University
2013 – Writers in School Resident, PEN/Faulkner Foundation
2016 – Screenwriting Fellow, Film Independent
2017 – Writers on the Verge, NBC

Awards and nominations

References

External links
 Official website

Living people
African-American women writers
21st-century American businesspeople
American business writers
Women business writers
American educators
Literacy advocates
Emerson College alumni
Towson University alumni
Women business executives
African-American businesspeople
1979 births
American women non-fiction writers
21st-century American businesswomen
21st-century African-American women
21st-century African-American people
African-American film producers
African-American film directors
American women film directors
20th-century African-American people
20th-century African-American women